Mary Ellen Hinamon Withrow (born October 2, 1930) is an American activist and former politician who served as the 40th Treasurer of the United States from March 1, 1994 to  January 20, 2001 under President Bill Clinton.

She also was Treasurer when the $5, $10, $20, $50, and $100 notes were redesigned in the 1990s.

Biography 
A native of Marion County, Ohio, Withrow served as the treasurer of her home state of Ohio, a position to which she was elected in 1982, 1986, and 1990.  Before that, she was elected Treasurer of her native Marion County, Ohio in 1976 and 1980. This makes her the only person to have held the post of treasurer at all three levels of government — local, state and national.

Withrow began her career in public service in 1969 as the first woman elected to the Elgin Local School Board in Marion County. As Ohio's Treasurer, Withrow instituted new programs, achieved record earnings, and was nationally recognized for her efficient management. Withrow was a Presidential Elector for Ohio in 1992 and a delegate to the 2000 Democratic National Convention from Ohio. She again served as a member of the Ohio delegation at the 2004 Democratic National Convention.

Recognition

Withrow is the recipient of numerous honors, including the Donald L. Scantlebury Memorial Award from the Treasury's Joint Financial Management Improvement Program for financial excellence and improvement in government, and the nation's "Most Valuable State Public Official" by City & State Newspaper in 1990.

She has been the president of several Treasury-related associations, including the National Association of State Treasurers, and the National Association of State Auditors, Comptrollers and Treasurers.

Activism
Withrow is an activist for women in government and is a member of the board of directors of Women Executives in State Government, an inductee into the Ohio Women's Hall of Fame and a recipient of a Women Executives in State Government fellowship to Harvard University. Following her retirement from office in January 2001, Withrow became active in the US Treasury's historical society. Withrow's collection of personal documents, photographs, awards and personal papers are housed at the Marion County Historical Society, Marion, Ohio.  She has appeared in television ads supporting Ohio's Issue 3 casino proposal. She is also quoted extensively in newspaper advertisements and direct mailings of by Federated Mint LLC and Lincoln Treasury. These advertisements use her former title to give legitimacy to questionable items.

Legacy
Marion City Schools announced in September 2019 that it would be naming two new schools after Withrow - Mary Ellen Withrow Middle School Academy and the Mary Ellen Withrow High School Academy.

References

External links

1930 births
Living people
Harvard University people
People from Marion, Ohio
State treasurers of Ohio
Treasurers of the United States
1992 United States presidential electors
Women in Ohio politics
County officials in Ohio
Ohio Democrats
Clinton administration personnel
21st-century American women